The U.S. state of Florida has three National Football League teams, two Major League Baseball teams, two National Basketball Association teams, two National Hockey League teams, two Major League Soccer teams and 13 NCAA Division I college teams.

Florida gained its first permanent major-league professional sports team in 1966 when the American Football League added the Miami Dolphins. The state of Florida has given professional sports franchises some subsidies in the form of tax breaks since 1991.

By sport

American football

Miami's first entry into the American Football League was the Miami Dolphins, which competed in the fourth AFL league from 1966 to 1969. In 1970 the Dolphins joined the National Football League when the AFL–NFL merger, agreed to in 1966, was finalized. The team made its first Super Bowl appearance in Super Bowl VI, but lost to the Dallas Cowboys. The following year, the Dolphins completed the NFL's only perfect season culminating in a Super Bowl win.  The 1972 Dolphins were the third NFL team to accomplish a perfect regular season, and won Super Bowl VIII, Miami also appeared in Super Bowl XVII and Super Bowl XIX, losing both games. The Dolphins are the oldest major league professional sports team in Florida.

The Tampa Bay Buccaneers began in 1976 as an expansion team of the NFL. They struggled at first, losing their first 26 games in a row to set a league record for futility. After a brief taste of success in the late 1970s, the Bucs again returned to their losing ways, and at one point lost 10+ games for 12 seasons in a row. The hiring of Tony Dungy in 1996 started an improving trend that eventually led to the team's victory in Super Bowl XXXVII in 2003 under coach Jon Gruden. In Super Bowl LV, the Bucs became the first NFL team to host and play in the Super Bowl, where they defeated the Kansas City Chiefs 31-9.

The Jacksonville Jaguars joined the NFL as an expansion team in the 1995 season; they play their home games at TIAA Bank Field.

The Tampa Bay Vipers began play in the XFL in February 2020; they play their home games at Raymond James Stadium.

The World Football League featured the Florida Blazers, Jacksonville Sharks and Jacksonville Express, whereas the United States Football League included the Tampa Bay Bandits, Jacksonville Bulls and Orlando Renegades. The Orlando Rage played in the original XFL in 2001, and the Orlando Apollos played in the Alliance of American Football in 2019.

The Miami metro area has hosted the Super Bowl a total of eleven times (six Super Bowls at Hard Rock Stadium, including Super Bowl LIV and five at the Miami Orange Bowl), tying New Orleans for the most games. Tampa has hosted five Super Bowls: Super Bowl XVIII (1984), Super Bowl XXV (1991), Super Bowl XXXV (2001), Super Bowl XLIII (2009), and Super Bowl LV (2020). The first two events were held at Tampa Stadium, and the other three at Raymond James Stadium. In 2005, Jacksonville hosted Super Bowl XXXIX.

The Orange Bowl is a major college football bowl, held at the Miami metropolitan area since 1935, and is currently a member of the College Football Playoff's New Year's Six.

Other college bowl games in Florida include the Boca Raton Bowl in Boca Raton, the Cheez-It Bowl, Citrus Bowl, and Cure Bowl in Orlando, the Gasparilla Bowl and Outback Bowl in Tampa, and the Gator Bowl in Jacksonville.

Jacksonville traditionally hosts the Florida–Georgia game, an annual college football game between the University of Florida and the University of Georgia since 1933.

Baseball

Florida has a rich baseball history and has long been home to minor league teams and spring training.

In 1993, the Miami Marlins became the first Major League Baseball team to call Florida home. They won the World Series in 1997 and 2003.

The Tampa Bay Rays began playing in 1998 at Tropicana Field in St. Petersburg. After a decade of futility, the Rays won the 2008 American League Pennant and made it to the World Series but lost to the Philadelphia Phillies. The team won the 2020 American League Pennant and made it back to the World Series but lost to the Los Angeles Dodgers.

15 of the 30 Major League Baseball teams conduct spring training in the state, with teams informally organized into the Grapefruit League. Throughout MLB history, other teams have held spring training in Florida but now hold spring training in Arizona's Cactus League.

Every Grapefruit League team also operates a minor league team in the rookie-level Florida Complex League and holds their spring training at that facility. Many of these teams also have an affiliate in Low-A Southeast (as do the Cincinnati Reds, who are the only non-Grapefruit League team with a minor league affiliate in Florida). Two teams have Double A affiliates based in Florida.

Minor league baseball teams in Florida include:

Florida Complex League

Low-A Southeast

Class AA

Basketball
Before Florida had its first NBA franchise, the Miami Floridians, later in their history known as The Floridians, played in the American Basketball Association (ABA) from 1968 through 1972.

The Miami Heat of the National Basketball Association was formed in 1988 as an expansion team. They have won three league championships (in 2006, 2012 and 2013), plus six conference titles.

The Orlando Magic began playing in NBA in 1989 as an expansion franchise. They have won the Eastern Conference championships in 1995 and 2009.

In 2020, the NBA decided to finish the delayed NBA season in a bubble in the ESPN Wide World of Sports in Orlando, Florida. All of the teams relocated to Walt Disney World and played their games there.

Due to the travel restrictions derived from the COVID-19 Pandemic, the Toronto Raptors temporarily relocated to Tampa, playing their home games at Amalie Arena.

Florida also had two WNBA teams: the Orlando Miracle (1999-2002) and Miami Sol (2000-2002).

Ice hockey

Established in 1938, the Tropical Hockey League was the first experiment with professional hockey in the American South. It lasted for one season as a professional league, consisting of four teams all based in Miami, then was resurrected as an amateur league before folding in 1941.

The Miami Screaming Eagles co-founded the World Hockey Association in 1971, but never played due to a lack of a suitable arena.

Florida is home to two National Hockey League teams. The Tampa Bay Lightning was established in 1992, and currently play their home games in the Amalie Arena, located in downtown Tampa. In 2004, the team won their first Stanley Cup. In the 2019–20 season the Lightning won their second Stanley Cup, and won a third the following season. The Lightning made the Eastern Conference Final in 2011, 2017, and 2018 and were Eastern Conference Champions in 2015 and  2022.

The Florida Panthers was founded in 1993. It originally played at the Miami Arena, and moved to the BB&T Center in 1998. They have made one appearance in the Stanley Cup Finals in 1996 but were swept by the Colorado Avalanche.

Florida has three ECHL minor hockey league teams – the Nashville Predators affiliate Florida Everblades, New York Rangers affiliate Jacksonville Icemen, and Tampa Bay Lightning affiliate Orlando Solar Bears.

Soccer

Florida is home to two professional soccer franchises who compete in Major League Soccer (MLS): Orlando City SC (since 2015) and Inter Miami CF (since 2020). Former MLS franchises in Florida include the Tampa Bay Mutiny (1996 to 2001) and the Miami Fusion (1998 to 2001). 

Prior to MLS, Florida was previously represented in the original FIFA-backed, major professional North American Soccer League (NASL) by the Tampa Bay Rowdies and Fort Lauderdale Strikers. The Rowdies drew good crowds at Tampa Stadium, and won the Soccer Bowl in 1975. The Strikers franchise was originally based in Miami, and nicknamed the Toros (1972 to 1976) before moving to nearby Fort Lauderdale, Florida prior to the 1977 season. The franchise played their home matches at the Orange Bowl and Lockhart Stadium, and made two Soccer Bowl appearances: losing in 1974 and 1980. Notable NASL footballers who played in Florida include Rodney Marsh (Rowdies) and German legend Gerd Müller (Strikers). The NASL folded in 1984, leaving the United States without a top-level soccer league until Major League Soccer (MLS) began play in 1996.

After over a decade without an MLS team, Orlando City SC joined the league in 2015 after five seasons as a second-level team. The team played its first two MLS seasons at the venue now known as Camping World Stadium before opening Orlando City Stadium, now known as Exploria Stadium, in 2017. Orlando City's reserve side, Orlando City B, began play in the league now known as the USL Championship in 2016, suspended play after the 2017 season, and resumed play in 2019 as a founding member of the third-level USL League One. Orlando City would withdraw City B from League One after the 2020 season; City B did not play in the 2021 season, but will resume in 2022 as a founding member of another third-level league, MLS Next Pro. In 2016, the Orlando Pride, operated by Orlando City, began play in the National Women's Soccer League. They have played at the same venue as their parent club throughout their history ever since.

Miami's MLS team, Inter Miami CF, is partly owned by David Beckham and began league play in 2020. Inter Miami placed its own reserve side, Fort Lauderdale CF, in USL League One in 2020; that team would remain in USL1 until moving to MLS Next Pro in 2022. Miami's other professional team, Miami FC, was founded in 2016 and currently play in the USL Championship. The team initially played in the new, second-division North American Soccer League, then transitioned into the National Premier Soccer League, before a season in the National Independent Soccer Association, before making the jump to the Division II USL Championship where it plays today.

A second Tampa Bay Rowdies club began play in 2010 as F.C. Tampa Bay, and now currently play in the USL Championship (known before 2019 as the United Soccer League), joining the league after leaving the second-division North American Soccer League in 2016. In this time, they've won one championship in the 2012 North American Soccer League season. The Rowdies were also named co-league champions in 2020 after winning the USL Regular Season title and Eastern Conference Championship, but the title game was canceled due to COVID-19. They were Eastern Conference Champions again in 2021, but lost in the title game.

During the 1994 FIFA World Cup, Camping World Stadium in Orlando hosted several matches. At the upcoming 2026 FIFA World Cup, Hard Rock Stadium in Miami Gardens will host multiples matches.

Motorsports

NASCAR (headquartered in Daytona Beach) begins all three of its major auto racing series in Florida at Daytona International Speedway in February, featuring the Daytona 500, and ends all three Series in November at Homestead-Miami Speedway. Daytona also has the Coke Zero 400 NASCAR race weekend around Independence Day in July. The 24 Hours of Daytona is one of the world's most prestigious endurance auto races.

The 12 Hours of Sebring sports car endurance race is the second largest sporting event in the State of Florida.  Each year drawing a total of over 100,000+ fans.  It is held in Sebring, Florida at the Sebring International Raceway on the third week of March each year.  It is one of the most prestigious car races in the world.  Sebring International Raceway's legendary 12-hour endurance race was voted the fourth best auto race of the world's motorsports races in the USAToday 10Best competition.  First run in 1952, the world's leading drivers and manufacturers have competed at the 12 Hours of Sebring for over six decades.  The race attracts drivers and fans from all over the world.

The Grand Prix of St. Petersburg and Grand Prix of Miami have held IndyCar races as well.

The Gainesville Raceway hosts the annual Gatornationals, one of the major NHRA drag events.

The Miami Grand Prix is a Formula One Grand Prix held at the Miami International Autodrome in Miami Gardens, Florida

Other sports

The PGA of America is headquartered in Palm Beach Gardens, the PGA Tour is headquartered in Ponte Vedra Beach, and the LPGA is headquartered in Daytona Beach.

The Players Championship, WGC-Cadillac Championship, Arnold Palmer Invitational, Honda Classic and Valspar Championship are PGA Tour rounds.

The Miami Open is an ATP Tour Masters 1000 and WTA Premier Mandatory tennis event, whereas the Delray Beach International Tennis Championships is an ATP World Tour 250 event.

Florida is a major horse and greyhound racing market. Notable horse racetracks include Gulfstream Park, Calder, Hialeah Park, Pompano Park and Tampa Bay Downs, whereas notable greyhound racetracks include Big Easy Casino and Derby Lane.

Minor league sports
Several minor league baseball, football, basketball, soccer and indoor football teams are based in Florida.

Previously, the Arena Football League had four different teams in Florida: the Florida Bobcats (1993-2001), Orlando Predators (1991-2016), Tampa Bay Storm (1991-2017) and Jacksonville Sharks (2010-2016).

College sports

Florida's universities have a number of notable National Collegiate Athletic Association Division I programs, especially the Florida State Seminoles and Miami Hurricanes of the Atlantic Coast Conference, and the Florida Gators of the Southeastern Conference. Other Division I teams include the FIU Panthers, Florida Atlantic Owls, North Florida Ospreys, South Florida Bulls, and UCF Knights.

By metro area

Miami

Miami's five major professional sports franchises are the Miami Dolphins of the National Football League (NFL), the Miami Heat of the National Basketball Association (NBA), the Miami Marlins of Major League Baseball (MLB), and the Florida Panthers of the National Hockey League (NHL), as well as Inter Miami CF, the Major League Soccer (MLS) expansion team led by David Beckham. Miami's major sports teams have won two Super Bowls, three NBA Finals, and two World Series.

The Miami area also has three NCAA Division I teams: the FIU Panthers in Miami, Florida Atlantic Owls in Boca Raton, and the Miami Hurricanes in Coral Gables.

The Miami area was previously represented by the Miami Toros / Ft. Lauderdale Strikers franchise in the original North American Soccer League (NASL) from 1972 to 1983; the Miami Fusion in Major League Soccer from 1998 to 2001; the Miami Floridians in the American Basketball Association (ABA) from 1968 to 1972; and the Miami Sol who played at the Women's National Basketball Association (WNBA) from 2000 to 2002.

Tampa Bay

Tampa Bay is represented by three major sports teams: the Tampa Bay Buccaneers of the National Football League, the Tampa Bay Lightning of the National Hockey League, and the Tampa Bay Rays of Major League Baseball, but is also home to USL Championship's Tampa Bay Rowdies and the Tampa Bay Vipers of the XFL. Tampa's major sports teams have won two Super Bowls and three Stanley Cups.

The Tampa Bay area is also home to four Minor League Baseball teams: the Bradenton Marauders, Clearwater Threshers, Dunedin Blue Jays, and Tampa Tarpons. The South Florida Bulls are Tampa's only Division I college team, though the area has several Division II teams, most notably the Tampa Spartans.

Tampa was previously the home of two professional soccer franchises: the Tampa Bay Rowdies in the original North American Soccer League (NASL), and the Tampa Bay Mutiny of Major League Soccer (MLS).

Orlando

Orlando is the home city of two major league professional sports teams — the Orlando Magic of the National Basketball Association (NBA), and Orlando City SC of Major League Soccer (MLS). Also, the Orlando Pride has competed in the National Women's Soccer League since 2016.

Orlando also has two minor league professional teams — the Orlando Solar Bears ECHL ice hockey team, and the Orlando Anarchy of the Women's Football Alliance. From 1991 to 2016, it was also home to the Orlando Predators of the Arena Football League and during 2019 it was home of the Orlando Apollos of the Alliance of American Football.

In addition, two NCAA Division I teams call the Orlando area home: the Stetson Hatters (who are based in DeLand) and the UCF Knights.

From 1999 to 2002, the Orlando Miracle competed in the Women's National Basketball Association before relocating to the Mohegan Sun casino in Connecticut as the Connecticut Sun.

None of Orlando's major sports teams have won any championships, but minor teams have collectively won two ArenaBowls (1998, 2000), two titles in ice hockey, three titles in minor league baseball, and two titles in soccer.

Jacksonville

Jacksonville is home to one major league sports team, the Jacksonville Jaguars of the National Football League (NFL). They also have several minor league teams including the Jacksonville Jumbo Shrimp for baseball, Jacksonville Sharks for indoor football, and Jacksonville Icemen for hockey.

Jacksonville's two NCAA Division I teams are the Jacksonville Dolphins and the North Florida Ospreys.

Teams

Major league professional teams

NCAA Division I college teams

Sports venues

Stadiums and arenas

Auto racing tracks

 Daytona International Speedway
 Gainesville Raceway
 Homestead-Miami Speedway
 Sebring International Raceway
 Streets of St. Petersburg
 Palm Beach International Raceway
 Five Flags Speedway

See also

 Sports teams in Florida
 Florida Sports Hall of Fame

References

External links